Dewayne Dwyer (born 13 September 1989) is a United States Virgin Islands international footballer.

Career statistics

International

References

External links
 Dewayne Dyer at CaribbeanFootballDatabase

1989 births
Living people
United States Virgin Islands soccer players
United States Virgin Islands international soccer players
Association football defenders